Taungdi) is a large village in Kyain Seikgyi Township, Kawkareik District, in the Kayin State of Myanmar.

References

External links
 "Taungdi Map – Satellite Images of Taungdi" Maplandia World Gazetteer

Populated places in Kayin State